The Samsung Galaxy Xcover 5 is an Android-based smartphone designed, marketed, and manufactured by Samsung Electronics. It was announced on March 4, 2021. The phone has a single-camera setup with a 16 MP main camera, a 5.3 in HD+ display, and a 3000 mAh Li-Ion battery. It ships with Android 11 (One UI 3).

Design 

The Samsung Galaxy Xcover 5 built with an aluminum frame, and a plastic back for the screen. The device is available in Black.

Specifications

Hardware 
It has loudspeakers, one located on the bottom edge and the other doubling as the earpiece. A USB-C port is used for charging and connecting other accessories.

The Samsung Galaxy Xcover 5 uses the Exynos 850 system on a chip, Octa-core (4x2.0 GHz Cortex-A55 & 4x2.0 GHz Cortex-A55) CPU, Mali-G52 GPU with 4 GB of RAM and 64 GB of non-expandable eMMC 5.1 internal storage.

The Samsung Galaxy Xcover 5 has a 3000 mAh battery, and is capable of fast charging at up to 15 W. It has an IP68 water protection rating.

The Samsung Galaxy Xcover 5 features a 5.3-inch 720p PLS LCD display. The display has a 18.5:9 aspect ratio.

The Samsung Galaxy Xcover 5 includes a  single rear-facing camera. The wide  f/1.8 lens 16-megapixel sensor, the front-facing camera uses a 5-megapixel sensor. It is capable of recording 1080p video at 30 fps.

Software 
This device ships with Android 11 (One UI 3).

References 

Android (operating system) devices
Samsung Galaxy
Mobile phones introduced in 2021
Samsung smartphones